Suphan Buri Line is a railway line in Western Thailand, opened on 16 June 1963, by Prime Minister Sarit Thanarat. There were initially 16 stations, but only seven stations now remain in operation. The line branches off from the Southern Line.

At present, only one train is served once a day at 04.40 p.m. The train departs from Bangkok railway station and reach the destination at 07.40 p.m.

And returning from Suphan Buri to Bangkok the train departs at 04.40 a.m. to destination at 8.10 a.m.

Stations

Gallery

References

External links 
 Suphan Buri Line in 2006 
 Suphan Buri Line in 2007 
 Railway bridges on Suphan Buri Line 

Railway lines in Thailand
Railway lines opened in 1963
Metre gauge railways in Thailand